Pic Eccles (4,041 m) is a mountain in the Mont Blanc massif in the Aosta Valley, Italy. It lies at the foot of the Innominata ridge to the summit of Mont Blanc. The mountain is named after the English mountaineer and geologist James Eccles.

Although the mountain was probably climbed on 31 August 1874 by J. G. A. Marshal with guides Johann Fisher and Ulrich Almer, the first certain ascent was on 30–31 August 1877 by James Eccles with guides Alphonse and Michel Payot during the first ascent of Mont Blanc de Courmayeur.

See also
List of Alpine four-thousanders

References

Alpine four-thousanders
Mountains of Aosta Valley
Mountains of the Alps
Mont Blanc massif